The 1896 Maine gubernatorial election took place on September 14, 1896.

Incumbent Governor Henry B. Cleaves did not seek re-election. Republican candidate Llewellyn Powers defeated Democratic candidate Melvin B. Frank.

Results

Notes

References

Gubernatorial
1896
Maine
September 1896 events